Scopula aphercta is a moth of the family Geometridae. It was described by Prout in 1932. It is found in Nigeria, Democratic Republic of Congo and Uganda.

References

Moths described in 1932
aphercta
Insects of the Democratic Republic of the Congo
Insects of West Africa
Moths of Africa
Taxa named by Louis Beethoven Prout